Muhammad Afzal Khokhar (born 6 April 1974) is a Pakistani politician who has been a member of the National Assembly of Pakistan, since August 2018. Previously he was a member of the National Assembly from 2008 to May 2018 and a Member of the Provincial Assembly of Punjab from 2002 to 2007.

Early life and education
He was born on 6 April 1974.

He graduated from the University of the Punjab in 1997 and obtained the degree of Bachelor of Arts from there.

Political career

Khokhar was elected to the Provincial Assembly of Punjab as a candidate of Pakistan Muslim League (N) (PML-N) from Constituency PP-160 (Lahore-XXIV) in 2002 Pakistani general election. He received 18,374 votes and defeated Malik Muhammad Karamat khokhar, a candidate of Pakistan Muslim League (Q) (PML-Q).

He was elected to the National Assembly of Pakistan as a candidate of PML-N from Constituency NA-128 (Lahore-XI) in 2008 Pakistani general election. He received 65,727 votes and defeated Malik Karamat Ali Khokhar, a candidate of Pakistan Peoples Party (PPP).

He was re-elected to the National Assembly as a candidate of PML-N from Constituency NA-128 (Lahore-XI) in 2013 Pakistani general election. He received 124,107 votes and defeated Malik Karamat Ali Khokhar, a candidate of Pakistan Tehreek-e-Insaf (PTI).

He was re-elected to the National Assembly as a candidate of PML-N from Constituency NA-136 (Lahore-XIV) in 2018 Pakistani general election.

References

Living people
Pakistan Muslim League (N) MNAs
Pakistan Muslim League (N) MPAs (Punjab)
Pakistani MNAs 2013–2018
1974 births
Place of birth missing (living people)
Pakistani MNAs 2008–2013
Punjab MPAs 2002–2007
Pakistani MNAs 2018–2023